On November 3, 1998, Washington, D.C., held an election for its mayor. The Democratic candidate, Anthony A. Williams, defeated Republican candidate Carol Schwartz. The parties' primary elections had been held on September 15, 1998.

Results

Democratic primary

Republican primary

D.C. Statehood primary

Umoja Party primary

References

mayor
Washington, D.C.
1998
Washington, D.C.